The Chairman of the National Assembly of the Republic of Bulgaria (Председател на Народното събрание на Република България, transliterated as Predsedatel na Narodnoto sabranie na Republika Balgariya) presides over the Bulgarian Parliament. The assembly selects the chairman during its opening session. The term of the chairman coincides with the term of the assembly. The salary of the chairman is 5 900 leva per month.

List of chairmen (1879–present) 
This is a list of all chairmen of the National Assembly of Bulgaria from its establishment in 1879 until today.

List of living former chairmen of the National Assembly

Notes 
 Naycho Tsanov retired for political reasons on 10 October 1919, his duties being done by vice-chairman Nedyalko Atanasov.
 Nikolay Georgiev was acting Chairman 20 April 1964 – 23 April 1964.
 After the 7th Grand National Assembly dissolved on 12 July 1991, it continued to function as an Ordinary National Assembly until 2 October the same year.
 Snezhana Bothusharova was acting Chairman 24 September 1992 – 5 November 1992
 Kamelia Kasabova was acting Chairman 4 February 2005 – 23 February 2005

References

See also 
 History of Bulgaria
 Politics of Bulgaria

Government of Bulgaria
Lists of political office-holders in Bulgaria
Bulgaria
1879 establishments in Bulgaria